Elections to Brentwood Borough Council were held on 1 May 2003.  One third of the council was up for election, all seats last being elected in 2002 following boundary changes.  Twelve years of Liberal Democrat control ended with the council passing into no overall control.

After the election, the composition of the council was
 Liberal Democrat 18
 Conservative 16
 Labour 3

Election result

The swing was 5.5% from the Liberal Democrats to the Conservatives.

Ward results

Composition of expiring seats before election

External links 
 Brentwood Council

2003
2003 English local elections
2000s in Essex